Electronic Products, also known as Electronic Products Magazine,  is an electronic component and technology trade magazine serving the electronic design community. The magazine was launched in 1957 and is based in Garden City, New York.

History and profile
Electronic Products was founded in 1957. The magazine was owned and published by Hearst Business Media until February 2015 when Arrow Electronics acquired the magazine and publishes it under AspenCore Media. Reaching over 120,000 electronic engineers (EEs) and others in the trade across the United States—in print and over twice that number online worldwide. Electronic Products is considered a leader in its category.

Electronic Products editorial sections provide information on new products from the smallest capacitor to the brightest light-emitting diode (LED). In addition, featured articles range from selecting the best components to fill an application need to the latest in developing electronic technologies. The editorial content is rounded out with application-specific product sections and transcripts of discussion roundtables on subjects from military to medical electronics.

Since 1977, Electronic Products has offered the Product of the Year Awards.

References

External links
 

Business magazines published in the United States
Design magazines
Hearst Communications publications
Magazines established in 1957
Professional and trade magazines
Science and technology magazines published in the United States
Engineering magazines